The Jayhawkers! is a 1959 American Technicolor VistaVision film directed by Melvin Frank, starring Jeff Chandler as Luke Darcy and Fess Parker as Cam Bleeker. The film is set in pre-Civil War Kansas. Darcy leads a gang which seeks to take advantage of Bleeding Kansas (loosely based on abolitionist John Brown); Bleeker joins the gang. The supporting cast features Henry Silva and Leo Gordon.

Plot summary
In the days before the Civil War, the Kansas Territory is torn by fighting over whether Kansas should enter the Union as a free state or a slave state. Cam Bleeker, a farmer who went to prison for leading a gang of raiders himself, breaks out of prison and rides to his home. A stranger, Jeanne Dubois, is living there with her two young children. She now owns the place.

Bleeker's wife's grave is outside the house, along with the grave of Dubois' late husband. Mrs. Bleeker died under mysterious circumstances. Bleeker says he broke out of prison when he heard she was involved with another man. Dubois says Mrs. Bleeker's grave was there when the Dubois family bought the place six months ago. Dubois' husband was shot dead by Missouri Redlegs raiders right after the family arrived.

Dubois, telling Bleeker there's a reward out for him and she could turn him in, convinces him to stay at the farm because she can't run it by herself. But the sheriff finds out Bleeker is there, and government soldiers come and take Bleeker away.

He is brought to Gov. William Clayton, who makes a deal with Bleeker: Bleeker won't hang if he can go and capture Luke Darcy and bring him to justice, any way he can. Darcy is a dangerous, frontier dictator whose raiders threaten to take over the whole territory. Clayton twists Bleeker's arm into tracking down Darcy by revealing that it was Darcy – a serial seducer of women – who destroyed Bleeker's wife. But Clayton warns Bleeker not to cross him – he wants Darcy taken alive.

Bleeker comes upon a hanging party in progress, involving Darcy gang members, and manages to snatch one of the condemned away and forces him to take him to Darcy, who has just taken over a town. Inside the saloon headquarters, Bleeker introduces himself to Darcy, and demonstrates his talents as a fighter, convincingly enough to be allowed to join Darcy's gang. Darcy warily accepts him, and as they become acquainted, reveals to Bleeker how he goes about his "war" to take over Kansas, by raiding town after town. He also brazenly reveals what happened to Bleeker's wife. "To me a woman is like a wine", he says, "something to be enjoyed. When it's over and there's nothing left in the bottle, you must throw it away and find another." Darcy's wife was such a victim of his, but Darcy uses some fast-talking psychology and a claim that it was a consensual affair to blunt Bleeker's thoughts of revenge, and he stays with the gang.

During a raid at Knight's Crossing, a town near the Dubois farm, horsemen unintentionally run down and injure Dubois' daughter. Bleeker, still wearing his gang garb, takes her home. Dubois sees that her daughter is still alive, but is enraged about Bleeker's complicity in Darcy's methods, which put the lives of innocents at risk. Bleeker promises it won't happen again.

After they take the girl to the doctor, Bleeker goes to have another talk with the governor. Bleeker has devised a plan to set a trap to catch Darcy. Bleeker found out that there's a train due in to Abilene with a load of gold. Bleeker's plan is to have the gang raid Abilene so it can be there when the gold train arrives. What Darcy won't know is that the governor will have filled the train with federal troops, turning it into a Trojan Horse to catch the gang. Clayton agrees to the plan, but reminds Bleeker not to cross him.

Bleeker sells Darcy on going after the gold, because it will be enough to buy half a million dollars' worth of arms and clear the way to victory in Darcy's war. So the gang goes ahead and infiltrates Abilene, takes over the town, and waits for the train to arrive. While they're waiting, Darcy tells Bleeker and Dubois (now on the scene as a willing accomplice) that it's time for them to leave, to go build a life for themselves somewhere else. He says in parting, "Don't worry about me. I got what I want. I got Kansas."

But Bleeker still has to finish his job for the governor. He knows Darcy has a dread of hanging, though, so before the trap swings shut he decides to confront Darcy and settle things between themselves, no matter what the governor said about taking him alive. Just before he meets Darcy at his saloon headquarters, however, Lordan, a gang member who has found out about the trap, reaches Darcy to warn him about it.

Bleeker enters the saloon, now full of gang members, including Darcy, who, informed that the troops are here, orders his men to get out of town. Then he faces Bleeker alone.

The two of them get into a fistfight, which Bleeker wins. But as he begins to take Darcy at gunpoint outside to face the gallows, Darcy talks bitterly about the imminent "carnival" of a hanging, and Bleeker – "Darcy, you talk too much", he says – decides on a gun duel. Bleeker kills Darcy in the duel, though it appears that Darcy might have mis-aimed his shot intentionally.

Bleeker, having broken his agreement by shooting Darcy, goes outside to surrender. But the governor, hearing Bleeker's reason, tells him, "Bleeker, you don't know why you couldn't let him hang, and I don't know why I'm letting you go free. But I've got a feeling we're both right."

Cast
 Jeff Chandler as Luke Darcy
 Fess Parker as Cam Bleeker
 Nicole Maurey as Jeanne Dubois
 Henry Silva as Lordan
 Herbert Rudley as Gov. William Clayton
 Jimmy Carter as Paul
 Shari Lee Bernath as Martha
 Leo Gordon as Jake Barton
 Barbara Knudson as Mrs. Maxton

Production
The film was made by the team of Norman Panama and Melvin Frank who had a deal with Paramount. They bought the story in January 1957. Panama and Frank were best known for their comedies and had made a comic Western, Callaway Went Thataway but The Jayhawkers was serious. Frank said at the time:
The world has changed in eight years. This is no time to satirize western myth; people won't stand for the making fun of something sacred. Actually, why The Jayhawkers is in the outdoor category and has outlaws and guns and horses, it's a western only in that it takes place on the then-frontier of 1859. Something frightening happened in Kansas on the eve of the Civil War... A man on horseback tried to become A Man on Horseback. He took over only a few towns- but what would've happened if he'd seized Kansas for his empire and the Civil War had allowed him to set up a kingdom in the West? The power mad character has always threatened freedom. We had long wanted to use this theme in a story about the American past and when we found this story... it clicked.
Panama and Frank subjected the script to analysis by a psychological consulting firm.

Melvin Frank tried to interest Vivien Leigh in the female lead. Chandler made the film on loan out from Universal International. Filming started 1 December 1958.

References

External links
 
 
 
 
 

1959 films
1959 Western (genre) films
American Civil War films
American Western (genre) films
1950s English-language films
Films directed by Melvin Frank
Films scored by Jerome Moross
Films set in Kansas
Paramount Pictures films
1950s American films